The 1979 Stanley Cup playoffs, the playoff tournament of the National Hockey League, (NHL) began on April 10, after the conclusion of the 1978–79 NHL season. The playoffs concluded on May 21, with the three-time defending champion Montreal Canadiens defeating the New York Rangers 4–1 to win the final series four games to one for the Stanley Cup. Three Original Six teams made the semifinals, which would not happen again until the 2014 Conference Finals.

Playoff seeds

The twelve teams that qualified for the playoffs are ranked 1–12 based on regular season points.

Note: Only teams that qualified for the playoffs are listed here.

 New York Islanders, Patrick Division champions, Clarence Campbell Conference regular season champions – 116 points
 Montreal Canadiens, Norris Division champions, Prince of Wales Conference regular season champions – 115 points
 Boston Bruins, Adams Division champions – 100 points
 Philadelphia Flyers – 95 points
 New York Rangers – 91 points
 Atlanta Flames – 90 points
 Buffalo Sabres – 88 points
 Pittsburgh Penguins – 85 points
 Toronto Maple Leafs – 81 points
 Los Angeles Kings – 80 points
 Chicago Black Hawks, Smythe Division champions – 73 points
 Vancouver Canucks – 63 points

Playoff bracket

 Division winners earned a bye to the Quarterfinals
 Teams were re-seeded based on regular season record after the Preliminary and Quarterfinal rounds

Preliminary round

(1) Philadelphia Flyers vs. (8) Vancouver Canucks

This was the first playoff series meeting between these two teams.

(2) New York Rangers vs. (7) Los Angeles Kings

This was the first playoff series meeting between these two teams.

(3) Atlanta Flames vs. (6) Toronto Maple Leafs

This was the first playoff series meeting between these two teams.

(4) Buffalo Sabres vs. (5) Pittsburgh Penguins

This was the first playoff series meeting between these two teams.

Quarterfinals

(1) New York Islanders vs. (8) Chicago Black Hawks

This was the second playoff series meeting between these two teams. New York won the only previous meeting in a two-game sweep in the 1977 Preliminary Round.

(2) Montreal Canadiens vs. (7) Toronto Maple Leafs

This was the fifteenth playoff meeting between these two teams; with the teams splitting the fourteen previous series. They met in previous year's Stanley Cup Semifinals, which Montreal won in a four-game sweep.

These teams did not meet again in the playoffs until 2021.

(3) Boston Bruins vs. (6) Pittsburgh Penguins

This was the first playoff series meeting between these two teams.

(4) Philadelphia Flyers vs. (5) New York Rangers

This was the second playoff series meeting between these two teams. Philadelphia won the only previous meeting in seven games in the 1974 Stanley Cup Semifinals.

Semifinals

(1) New York Islanders vs. (4) New York Rangers

This was the second playoff series meeting between these two teams. The Islanders won the only previous meeting 2–1 in the 1975 Preliminary Round.

(2) Montreal Canadiens vs. (3) Boston Bruins

This was the 18th playoff series meeting between these two teams, which Montreal led 15–2 in previous meetings. This series served as the final chapter in this rivalry for the late 1970s following Montreal's Cup Finals victories over Boston in 1977 and 1978 in four and six games respectively.

This series is best remembered for its dramatic conclusion in the late stages of game seven. Boston's Rick Middleton scored the go-ahead goal with four minutes remaining in regulation. Montreal's dynasty and success over Boston in the playoffs were suddenly in serious jeopardy. However, with time winding down to less than three minutes remaining, Boston committed a series-defining penalty for having too many men on the ice. With Montreal on the power play, Guy Lafleur scored the game-tying goal with 1:14 remaining to force overtime. Approaching the midway point of the first overtime, Yvon Lambert would score the series-winning goal to send the Canadiens to the Stanley Cup Finals for the fourth straight year. This marked the 14th straight playoff meeting between the two teams that ended with the Canadiens defeating the Bruins.

Stanley Cup Finals

This was the 12th playoff series (and only Finals) meeting between these two teams. New York led 6–5 in previous meetings. Their last encounter was won by New York in six games in the 1974 Stanley Cup Quarterfinals.

Prior to 2013, this was the last time two Original Six clubs met in the finals.

See also
1978–79 NHL season
List of NHL seasons
List of Stanley Cup champions

References

Bibliography
 

Stanley Cup playoffs
playoffs